Cellars is a novel by John Shirley published in 1982.

Plot summary
Cellars is a novel in which a journalist in New York becomes attracted to a woman with extra-sensory powers. This leads him down a "rabbit hole" into the secrets hidden under Manhattan.

Reception
Dave Pringle reviewed Cellars for Imagine magazine, and stated that "Although entirely different in tone, it shows the same obsession with things lurking beneath our feet, unnameable terrors in the forgotten 'cellars' of modern civilisation."

Reviews
Review by William Gibson (1982) in Science Fiction Review, Fall 1982
Review by Thomas M. Disch (1982) in Rod Serling's The Twilight Zone Magazine, November 1982

References

1982 novels